David O'Hiraghty was a 14th-century Irish bishop. He was appointed Dean of Armagh in 1330 and served until 1334;  and was Archbishop of Armagh from his Consecration at Avignon until his death on 16 May 1346.

References

Deans of Armagh
14th-century Roman Catholic bishops in Ireland
1346 deaths
Year of birth unknown